The 175th New York State Legislature, consisting of the New York State Senate and the New York State Assembly, met from January 6 to June 23, 1965, during the seventh year of Nelson Rockefeller's governorship, in Albany.

Background
Under the provisions of the New York Constitution of 1938, re-apportioned in 1953, 58 Senators and 150 assembly members were elected in single-seat districts for two-year terms. The senatorial districts consisted either of one or more entire counties; or a contiguous area within a single county. The counties which were divided into more than one senatorial district were Kings (nine districts), New York (six),  Queens (five), Bronx (four), Erie (three), Nassau (three), Westchester (three), Monroe (two) and Onondaga (two). The Assembly districts consisted either of a single entire county (except Hamilton Co.), or of contiguous area within one county.

In 1964, the U.S. Supreme Court handed down several decisions establishing that State legislatures should follow the One man, one vote rule to apportion their election districts. A special Federal Statutory Court declared the New York apportionment formulae for both the State Senate and the State Assembly unconstitutional, and the State Legislature was ordered to re-apportion the seats by April 1, 1965. The court also ruled that the 1964 legislative election should be held under the 1954 apportionment, but those elected could serve only for one year (in 1965), and an election under the new apportionment should be held in November 1965. Senators John H. Hughes and Lawrence M. Rulison (both Rep.) questioned the authority of the federal court to shorten the term of the 1964 electees, alleging excessive costs for the additional election in an off-year.

At this time there were two major political parties: the Democratic Party and the Republican Party. The Liberal Party, the Conservative Party, the Socialist Labor Party, and the Socialist Workers Party also nominated tickets. At the New York state election, 1964, on November 3, Democratic majorities were elected to both the State Senate and the State Assembly for the session of 1965.

The lame-duck Legislature of 1964 met for a special session at the State Capitol in Albany from December 15 to 31, 1964, to re-apportion the legislative districts for the election in November 1965, gerrymandering the districts according to the wishes of the Republican majority before the Democrats would take over the Legislature in January. The number of seats in the State Senate was increased to 65, and the number of seats in the Assembly to 165. County representation was abandoned in favor of population-proportional districts which could lie across county lines, and the new Assembly districts were numbered from 1 to 165.

Elections
The 1964 New York state election, was held on November 3. The only statewide elective office up for election was a U.S. Senator from New York. Democrat Robert F. Kennedy defeated the Republican incumbent Kenneth B. Keating. The approximate party strength at this election, as expressed by the vote for U.S. Senator, was: Democrats 3,540,000; Republicans 3,104,000; Liberals 285,000; Conservatives 212,000; Socialist Labor 7,000; and Socialist Workers 4,000.

Three of the four women members of the previous legislature—State Senator Constance Baker Motley, a lawyer of Manhattan; and Assembly Members Constance E. Cook (Rep.), a lawyer of Ithaca, and Aileen B. Ryan (Dem.), a former school teacher of the Bronx—were re-elected. Shirley Chisholm (Dem.), a preschool teacher of Brooklyn; and Dorothy H. Rose (Dem.), a high-school teacher and librarian of Angola, were also elected to the Assembly.

Sessions
The Legislature met for the regular session (the 188th) at the State Capitol in Albany on January 6, 1965; and adjourned on June 23.

Due to the split of the Democratic majorities in both Houses into followers of Mayor Robert F. Wagner, Jr. and U.S. Senator Robert F. Kennedy, neither House could be organized, and a month of deadlock ensued.

On February 1, the United States Supreme Court confirmed the Federal Statutory Court's order to elect a new New York Legislature in November 1965.

On February 3, Joseph Zaretzki (Dem.) was elected Temporary President of the State Senate with the votes of the Wagner Democrats and the Republicans.

On February 4, Anthony J. Travia (Dem.) was elected Speaker.

On April 14, the New York Court of Appeals declared the apportionment of December 1964 as unconstitutional, citing that the New York Constitution provides expressly that the Assembly shall have 150 seats, not 165 as were apportioned. The court also held that, although the constitutional State Senate apportionment formula provides for additional seats, the increase from 58 to 65 was unwarranted.

On May 10, the Federal Statutory Court ordered that the election on November 2, 1965, be held under the December 1964 apportionment, and that the Legislature thus elected re-apportion the seats again by February 1, 1966.

On August 24, the Federal Statutory Court clarified that, if the Governor and Legislature should not have enacted a new apportionment by February 1, 1966, then the Court would draft a new apportionment for the next election.

On October 11, the U.S. Supreme Court dismissed four appeals against the ruling of the Federal Statutory Court, and upheld the election of a new New York Legislature on November 2.

State Senate

Districts

Senators
The asterisk (*) denotes members of the previous Legislature who continued in office as members of this Legislature. Bernard G. Gordon, Robert Watson Pomeroy, William S. Calli and Kenneth R. Willard changed from the Assembly to the Senate.

Note: For brevity, the chairmanships omit the words "...the Committee on (the)..."

Employees
 Secretary:
 Albert J. Abrams (Rep.), holding over until February 9
 George H. Van Lengen (Dem.), from February 9
 Sergeant-at-Arms: John F. O'Hagen, from February 9

State Assembly

Assembly members
The asterisk (*) denotes members of the previous Legislature who continued in office as members of this Legislature. Walter E. Cooke changed from the Senate to the Assembly.

Note: For brevity, the chairmanships omit the words "...the Committee on (the)..."

Employees
 Clerk:
 Ansley B. Borkowski (Rep.), holding over until February 9
 John T. McKennan (Dem.), from February 9
 Sergeant-at-Arms:
 Raymond J. Roche (Rep.), until March 2
 William A. Wardlaw (Dem.), from March 2<ref>R. J. Roche Loses Post in Assembly in the Watertown Daily Times, of Watertown, on March 3, 1965</ref>
 Assistant Sergeant-at-Arms: Raymond J. Roche, from March 2

Notes

Sources
 Complete List of Names, Addresses Of All Members Of '65 State Legislature in the Civil Service Leader (Vol. XXVI, No. 18, pg. 8f; issue of January 5, 1965) 
 Legislature Committee Chairman Named in the Civil Service Leader'' (Vol. XXVI, No. 26, pg. 8; issue of March 2, 1965) 
 Members of the New York Senate (1960s) at Political Graveyard
 Members of the New York Assembly (1960s) at Political Graveyard

175
1965 in New York (state)
Legislature
1965 U.S. legislative sessions